Meral is a town in Garhwa district, Jharkhand state, India.

Geography
It is located at an altitude of 242 m, 217 km from the state capital, Ranchi, in Time Zone UTC +5:30 .

Population
According to census 2011 had a population of 1,30,308 inhabitants.

Garhwa district
Community development blocks in Jharkhand
Community development blocks in Garhwa district
Cities and towns in Garhwa district